This page details the match results and statistics of the Brazil olympic football team during the professionalism restriction era.

1950

1960

1970

1980

Record by opponent

References

Olympic
Brazil national under-23 football team